Abaas Ismail (born 19 May 1998) is a Finnish professional footballer who plays for Kiffen as a striker.

Club career
Ismail has played for PK-35 Vantaa, HIFK, Kiffen and Klubi 04.

He signed a two-year contract with HIFK in January 2017. He left the club in January 2018.

International career
He has represented Finland at under-18 youth level.

References

1998 births
Living people
Finnish footballers
PK-35 Vantaa (men) players
HIFK Fotboll players
FC Kiffen 08 players
Klubi 04 players
Veikkausliiga players
Kakkonen players
Ykkönen players
Association football forwards
Finland youth international footballers